Philinda Parsons Rand Anglemyer (1876–1972) was an American English-language teacher in the Philippines.  She was among the pioneering five hundred Thomasites who landed on the shores of the Philippines in August 1901 on board the United States Army Transport Thomas.

Biography
Rand is a native of Somerville, Massachusetts.  She was born to John B. and Victoria Cheek Rand. She graduated magna cum laude from Radcliffe College (class of 1899), with a degree in zoology. The tall and slender Rand was only twenty-three when she went to the Philippines, right after graduating from Radcliffe College. Her trip to the Philippines was under a program instituted by William Howard Taft, then governor of the Philippine Islands.  She wrote journals and letters to her relatives in the U.S. while in the Philippines, mostly to an aunt and a cousin named Katie.  During her tenure as an English teacher in the Philippines, she also took pictures that show many aspects of the life in the Philippines at the start of the twentieth century.  Most of these photographs were taken mostly in Silay and Lingayen where she resided.  Her pictures include people, students, missionaries, buildings, animals, and sceneries from 1901 to 1907.  Her journals, letters and photographs are now deposited at the Schlesinger Library on the History of Women in America at Radcliffe College. Her diaries also described her travels to China and Japan.

While in the Philippines, Philinda Rand married a fellow American and another Thomasite, Thaddeus Delos Anglemyer.  Her first daughter, Katharine, was born in the Philippines.  Rand stayed in the Philippines for seven years.

In 1908, Rand and her family returned to the United States, where her second daughter, Mary, was born. She lived in Washington, Indiana, New York, and New Jersey before finally settling  in Washington, D.C. in 1954.  She served on local welfare and education committees, worked as a substitute teacher in public schools, and was active in youth and environmental conservation organizations.  Rand also had a sister, Marguerite Rand.

Quotations

See also
History of the Philippines
Philippine English

References

Footnotes

Bibliography
Tambo, D. Guide to the Philinda Rand Anglemyer Philippines Collection, CDLib.org and Library.UCSB.edu, 2004, The Regents of The University of California, 2006, retrieved on: June 23, 2007
Scope and Content of Collection, Guide to the Philinda Rand Anglemyer Philippines Collection, CDLib.org and Library.UCSB.edu, 2004, The Regents of The University of California, 2006, retrieved on: June 23, 2007
Guide to the Philinda Rand Anglemyer Philippines Collection, Philinda Rand Anglemyer Philippines Collection, ca. 1901-1907, Collection Number: Bernath Mss 102, Creator: Anglemyer, Philinda Rand and University of California Library, Department of Special Collections, Santa Barbara, California 93106-9010 (Repository), The Regents of The University of California, 2006, retrieved on June 23, 2007

External links
Papers, 1901-1909: A Finding Aid. Schlesinger Library, Radcliffe Institute, Harvard University.

1876 births
1972 deaths
American educators
American people in the American Philippines
People from Massachusetts
People from Somerville, Massachusetts
People from Washington, D.C.
Radcliffe College alumni
20th-century American educators
20th-century American women educators